Athletics at the 2011 Games of the Small States of Europe were held from 1 – 4 June 2011 at the Rheinwiese Schaan.

Medal summary

Men

Women

Men's results

100 metres

Heats – June 1Wind:Heat 1: +1.8 m/s, Heat 2: +1.1 m/s

Final – June 1Wind:+1.3 m/s

200 metres

Heats – June 3Wind:Heat 1: +1.1 m/s, Heat 2: +1.4 m/s

Final – June 4Wind:+0.7 m/s

400 metres

Heats – June 1

Final – June 3

800 metres
June 1

1500 metres
June 4

5000 metres
June 1

10,000 metres
June 4

110 metres hurdles
June 3Wind: 0.0 m/s

400 metres hurdles
June 3

3000 metres steeplechase
June 3

4 x 100 meters relay
June 4

4 x 400 meters relay
June 4

High jump
June 4

Pole vault
June 1

Long jump
June 3

Triple jump
June 1

Shot put
June 4

Discus throw
June 3

Javelin throw
June 1

Women's results

100 metres

Heats – June 1Wind:Heat 1: +2.1 m/s, Heat 2: +1.5 m/s

Final – June 1Wind:+1.8 m/s

200 metres

Heats – June 3Wind:Heat 1: +1.2 m/s, Heat 2: +0.5 m/s

Final – June 4Wind:+1.5 m/s

400 metres

Heats – June 1

Final – June 3

800 metres
June 1

1500 metres
June 3

5000 metres
June 3

10,000 metres
June 1

100 metres hurdles
June 4Wind: +1.0 m/s

400 metres hurdles
June 3

4 x 100 meters relay
June 4

4 x 400 meters relay
June 4

High jump
June 1

Pole vault
June 3

Long jump
June 3

Triple jump
June 4

Shot put
June 4

Discus throw
June 3

Medal table

Participating teams

  (8)
  (42)
  (13)
  (6) (Host team)
  (23)
  (17)
  (13)
  (3)
  (10)

References
Athletics Site of the 2011 Games of the Small States of Europe

Games of the Small States of Europe
Athletics
2011
2011 Games of the Small States of Europe Athletics